The Fader (stylized as FADER) is a magazine based in New York City that was launched in 1999 by Rob Stone and Jon Cohen. The magazine covers music, style and culture. It was the first print publication to be released on iTunes.
It is owned by The Fader Media group, which also includes its website, thefader.com, as well as Fader films, Fader Label and Fader TV.

The Fader Fort
The Fader Fort is an annual invitation-only event at Austin, Texas's South by Southwest (SXSW) founded in 2001. The four-day party features live performances. Fader Fort NYC is a party produced during the annual CMJ Music Marathon.

Anthony Fantano controversy
In October 2017, The Fader published an article by Ezra Marcus about YouTube music critic Anthony Fantano of The Needle Drop which accused his now-defunct second channel, thatistheplan, of catering to an alt-right audience, while scrutinizing Fantano's past associations with right-wing and anti-SJW provocateurs such as Sam Hyde and Carl Benjamin and the controversial imageboard 4chan. Fantano posted a video response in which he disputed Marcus' interpretation of thatistheplan'''s content and pointed out factual inaccuracies in the article, which he described as a "hit piece". The article was eventually taken down following a settlement between Fantano and The Fader'' in 2018.

References

External links
 

African-American magazines
Bimonthly magazines published in the United States
Lifestyle magazines published in the United States
Music magazines published in the United States
Hip hop magazines
Independent magazines
Magazines established in 1999
Magazines published in New York City
1999 establishments in New York City